The Laguna Colorada Formation is a geological formation of the Austral Basin in Patagonia, Argentina. The formation belongs to the El Tranquilo Group and dates back to the Early Jurassic, with a maximum age of 192.78 ± 0.14 Ma.

Vertebrate paleofauna 
Dinosaur tracks geographically located in Santa Cruz Province, Argentina.

See also 
 List of dinosaur-bearing rock formations

References

Further reading 
 A. M. Báez and C. A. Marsicano. 1998. A heterodontosaurian ornithischian in the Upper Triassic of southern Patagonia?. Gondwana 10: Event Stratigraphy of Gondwana, Cape Town, South Africa 27:14-15
 J. F. Bonaparte and M. Vince. 1979. El hallazgo del primer nido de dinosaurios triasicos, (Saurischia, Prosauropoda), Triasico Superior de Patagonia, Argentina [The discovery of the first nest of Triassic dinosaurs (Saurischia, Prosauropoda,) from the Upper Triassic of Patagonia, Argentina]. Ameghiniana 16(1-2):173-182
 R. M. Casamiquela. 1964. Sobre el hallazgo de dinosaurios triásicos en la Prov. de Santa Cruz [On the discovery of Triassic dinosaurs in Santa Cruz Prov.]. Argentina Austral 35:10-11
 D. Pol and J. E. Powell. 2007. Skull anatomy of Mussaurus patagonicus (Dinosauria: Sauropodomorpha) from the Late Triassic of Patagonia. Historical Biology 19(1):125-144

Geologic formations of Argentina
Triassic System of South America
Triassic Argentina
Norian Stage
Siltstone formations
Dolomite formations
Ichnofossiliferous formations
Formations
Fossiliferous stratigraphic units of South America
Paleontology in Argentina
Geology of Santa Cruz Province, Argentina
Geology of Patagonia